The National Democratic Alliance (Acción Democratico Nacional) is a political party in Aruba. 
In the elections for the Estates on September 28, 2001, the party won 1.1% of the popular vote and gained none of the 21 seats.

The NDA organization collapsed in 1998.

See also
Politics of Aruba
List of political parties in Aruba

Political parties in Aruba